Moody Peak is a peak over  high marking the northern limit of the Boomerang Range in Antarctica. It was named by the Advisory Committee on Antarctic Names in 1964 for Junior L. Moody, aviation boatswain's mate, U.S. Navy, in charge of loading and of loading aircraft at McMurdo Station in 1959–60.

References

Mountains of Oates Land